Abdul Salam was a justice on the Supreme Court of the Islamic Emirate of Afghanistan during the 1990s regime.

References

Sharia judges
Taliban members
Afghan judges
Living people
Year of birth missing (living people)
Place of birth missing (living people)
Supreme Court Justices of Afghanistan